Richard Baker, D.D. (1741–1818) was an English theological writer.

Life
Baker was educated at Pembroke College, Cambridge, where he graduated B.A. (as seventh senior optime) in 1762, M.A. in 1765, and D.D. in 1788. He was elected to a fellowship in his college, and in 1772 was presented to the rectory of Cawston-with-Portland in Norfolk, which he held till his death in 1818.

Works
Baker's works are:
 How the Knowledge of Salvation is attainable, a sermon on John vii. 17, 1782, 4to. 
 The Harmony or Agreement of the Four Evangelists, in four parts, London, 1783–87, 8vo. 
 The Psalms of David Evangelized, wherein are seen the Unity of Divine Truth, the Harmony of the Old and New Testament, and the peculiar Doctrines of Christianity, in agreement with the Experience of Believers in all Ages, London, 1811, 8vo.

References

Attribution:

1741 births
1818 deaths
19th-century English theologians
Alumni of Pembroke College, Cambridge
English religious writers
18th-century English non-fiction writers
18th-century English male writers
18th-century English writers
19th-century English non-fiction writers
18th-century English Anglican priests
19th-century English Anglican priests